John Dolman, Dowman or Dowlman (died 1526) was an English clergyman and benefactor.

John Dolman was the son of William Dowman of Pocklington in the East Riding of Yorkshire. He was educated at Cambridge University, graduating B.Civ.L. in 1488 and D.Civ.L. in 1494. From 1507 until his death he was archdeacon of Suffolk. He established Pocklington Grammar School —now Pocklington School — in 1514, and founded five scholarships and nine sizarships at St John’s College, Cambridge. He also founded a chantry for two priests in St Paul’s Cathedral.

Will dated 8 November 1526, to be buried in the chapel of St Catharine, on the south side of the cathedral of St Paul, against the pavement under the altar there, by him made.

He bore: Azure, on a fesse dancettee between 8 garbs or, birds close on the field, beaked and membered gules. Crest: On a bezant a bird as in the arms.

References

External links
Genealogy Data of Dolman (or Dowman) of Pocklington, Spaldington, etc. (Yorkshire)
Pocklington Town Guide 1999-2000
Pocklington Schools
Pocklington
GENUKI: Pocklington Parish information from National Gazetteer 1868

16th-century English clergy
16th-century English Roman Catholic priests
Archdeacons of Suffolk
1526 deaths
Year of birth missing
Alumni of the University of Cambridge
Clergy from Yorkshire
People from Pocklington